Donna Baier Stein is an American author, publisher, and copywriter.

Biography 
Donna was a Founding Editor of Bellevue Literary Review and founded and publishes Tiferet Journal. She has received a Bread Loaf Scholarship, Johns Hopkins University MFA Fellowship, grants from the New Jersey Council on the Arts and Poetry Society of Virginia, and a Scholarship from the Summer Literary Seminars.

Donna's stories and poems have appeared in the Virginia Quarterly Review, The Saturday Evening Post, Writer's Digest, Confrontation, Prairie Schooner, New York Quarterly, Washingtonian, as well as in the anthologies I've Always Meant to Tell You (Pocket Books), To Fathers: What I've Never Said (featured in O Magazine), Men and Women: Together and Alone from Spirit That Moves Us Press.

She was a freelance direct marketing copywriter from 1980 to 2014, writing for Smithsonian, World Wildlife Fund, and other publishers and environmental groups. She created seminars on copywriting for the Direct Marketing Association and has taught copywriting and creative writing at universities and organizations. Her two nonfiction books on copywriting are Write on Target (co-authored with Floyd Kemske and published by McGraw Hill) and The New Marketing Conversation (co-authored with Alex MacAaron and published by Thomson Publishing Group).

Baier Stein was named Direct Marketer of the Year by the New England Direct Marketing Association in 2004.

Books 

 Scenes from the Heartland (Stories, Serving House Books, 2019)
 Letting Rain Have Its Say (Poetry, Kelsay Books, 2018)
 The Silver Baron's Wife (Novel, Serving House Books, 2016)
 Sympathetic People (Stories, Serving House Books, 2013)
 Sometimes You Sense the Difference (Poetry, Finishing Line Press, 2012)
 The New Marketing Conversation with Alexandra MacAaron: Creating and Strengthening Relationships (Racom Communications, 2004)
 Tiferet Journal (Founder and Publisher, 2004–Present)
 To Fathers: What I’ve Never Said (contributor, Story Line Press, 2001)
 Write on Target: The Direct Marketers Copywriting Handbook (with Floyd Kemske, McGraw-Hill, 1997)
 I’ve Always Meant to Tell You; Letters to Our Mothers – An Anthology of Contemporary Women Writers (contributor, Pocket Books, 1997)

Awards and honors
 Foreword Indies winner for Scenes from the Heartland 
PEN/New England Discovery Award for The Silver Baron's Wife
 Bronze winner in Foreword Reviews 2017 Book of the Year Award for The Silver Baron's Wife
 Will Rogers Medallion Award finalist for The Silver Baron's Wife
 Paterson Prize for Fiction for The Silver Baron's Wife 
 Iowa Fiction Award Finalist for Sympathetic People 
 Next Generation Indie Book Awards Finalist in Short Fiction for Sympathetic People 
 Scholarship from Bread Loaf Writers Conference 
 Awards from the Poetry Societies of Virginia and New Hampshire Poetry Society
 Fellowship from Johns Hopkins University Writing Seminars
 Fellowship from the New Jersey Council on the Arts

References

External links
Author website
Literary Journal
Publishers Weekly Review
Kirkus Review
Women's Voices for Change Review

1951 births
Living people
Writers from Kansas City, Missouri
American women poets
21st-century American women